Deathloop is a first-person shooter video game developed by Arkane Lyon and published by Bethesda Softworks. The game was released on 14 September 2021 for PlayStation 5 and Windows, and on 20 September 2022 for Xbox Series X/S. It received generally favorable reviews from critics, who praised the art design and gameplay. Deathloop won Best Game Direction and Best Art Direction at The Game Awards 2021.

Gameplay

In Deathloop, the player takes on the role of Colt, an assassin stuck in a time loop who has been tasked to take out eight targets called Visionaries across the island of Blackreef before midnight, as leaving even one alive will cause the time loop to reset and undo his work. Should Colt die before taking out the eight targets, he will wake back up at the start of the loop. The player uses a combination of stealth, parkour, attack skills, guns, gadgets, and powers as in Arkane's previous games Dishonored and Prey to move about the game world. They must avoid or take out guards, learn the patterns of Colt's targets, and to figure out the right order to eliminate said targets using guns, melee attacks, or other environmental means.

The time loop in Deathloop is not strictly timed and is aimed to give players more time and freedom to take out these eight targets in one loop. Each day is divided into four periods (Morning, Noon, Afternoon, and Evening), and moving between the island's four districts (Updaam, Karl's Bay, Fristad Rock, and The Complex) causes time to advance. The routines of the people in a particular district vary depending on what time of day the player enters it, and the player's actions in one district can affect the routines in the others.

The game features a multiplayer aspect in which the player can alternatively take the role of Julianna, an agent tasked to protect the time loop and take out Colt. When the player takes this role, they will enter a random player's game and may interfere with their play. The multiplayer portion is optional and players can prevent others from taking on the role of Julianna in their game, instead leaving this to a computer-controlled opponent to try to stop Colt.

Synopsis

Setting
Set in an alternate world resembling the 1960s, Deathloop takes place over the course of a single repeating day on the subarctic island of Blackreef. First charted in 1931, Blackreef was originally home to a small fishing settlement and a military base where experiments were conducted on local temporal anomalies. It is now owned by the AEON Program, founded by scientist Egor Serling to exploit the island's unique properties to gain immortality by living in an infinite time loop. Serling attracted eight other eccentric and talented individuals to his cause, the Visionaries, and scores of young, fanatical followers called Eternalists dedicated to serving them. Thanks to the time loop, the members of the AEON Program are able to hold a never-ending party where they can do anything they desire without fear of consequences, since the loop resets at midnight and restores everyone to their original state with no memories of the previous day.

Disrupting the natural flow of the loop are two of the Visionaries: Colt Vahn and Julianna Blake. Julianna is immune to the time loop's memory erasure, and every day she alerts all of Blackreef's inhabitants that Colt has betrayed the AEON Program and wants to break the loop, causing everyone to hunt him. Colt develops the ability to retain his memories from previous days as well, and is thus able to learn the behaviors and patterns of the Visionaries and Eternalists. In order to break the loop, Colt must assassinate all eight of the other Visionaries, including Julianna, in one day, because the loop requires only one of them to still be alive at midnight in order to reset again.

The game's director Dinga Bakaba confirmed that Deathloop exists in the same universe as the Dishonored series, far in the future after the events of Dishonored: Death of the Outsider, and both the Dishonored series and Deathloop include references alluding to one another.

Characters
The central characters of Deathloop are the nine Visionaries:

Colt Vahn (voiced by Jason E. Kelley) - The previous head of security of the AEON Program who seeks to break the loop and escape Blackreef.
Julianna Blake (voiced by Ozioma Akagha) - AEON's archivist and new head of security, who is constantly hunting Colt.
Egor Serling (voiced by Josh Zuckerman) - The founder of the AEON Program and a self-proclaimed "pseudoscientist".
Dr. Wenjie Evans (voiced by Erika Ishii) - AEON's head scientist and the builder of the loop machine that generates the time loop.
Harriet Morse (voiced by Marcella Lentz-Pope) - The leader of the cult of Eternalists.
Ramblin' Frank Spicer (voiced by Andrew Lewis Caldwell) - A former mobster turned aspiring rockstar, and host of Blackreef's only radio show.
Charlie Montague (voiced by Khoi Dao) - A brilliant yet sadistic game designer and AEON's Head of Entertainment.
Fia Zborowska (voiced by Cherami Leigh) - An experimental artist and junkie with a love for explosives.
Aleksis "The Wolf" Dorsey (voiced by H. Michael Croner) - AEON's hard-partying financial backer.

Plot
Awakening from a dream where he is murdered by an unknown woman, Colt Vahn suddenly wakes up hungover on a beach with no memories of himself or where he is. He receives guidance from messages and meetings from alternate versions of himself, instructing him to break the time loop he is trapped in. In order to do this, he must kill all eight Visionaries before time loops at the end of the day. Complicating matters is Julianna Blake, who warns the Visionaries and their followers, the Eternalists, of Colt's plan and calls for him to be hunted down. Julianna taunts Colt to try and break the loop, even though she works to stop him. Colt finds that unlike the other inhabitants of the island, he has gained the ability to retain his memories across loops, allowing him to better plan and prepare for his ultimate goal of breaking the loop. He learns that Julianna appears to retain her memories across loops, as well. 

While Colt is able to come up with a plan to kill seven of the Visionaries, Julianna remains the most elusive, choosing to hide in the Loop, the structure that powers Blackreef's time loops. The only way to reach the Loop is to use an abandoned rocket plane left behind by the military, so Colt begins investigating all of the old bunkers littered across the island. He learns that he was one of the members of Operation Horizon, the original military expedition to Blackreef decades earlier, but was accidentally sent into the future due to an experiment gone awry. Colt joined the AEON Program in hopes of finding a way to travel back to the past and reunite with his girlfriend Lila. As a consequence of being sent to the future, he discovers that Julianna is in fact his daughter. Colt manages to activate the rocket plane and reach the Loop, where he confronts Julianna directly. Julianna claims that things started to go wrong when Colt, having had second thoughts about the AEON Program, started murdering her in every loop in an effort to free her from it. Julianna eventually grew to hate Colt and began to retaliate, culminating in her starting to hunt him in every loop. Julianna presents Colt with a choice: kill her and break the loop to suffer whatever uncertain future occurs afterwards, or spare her so they can continue living eternally through the loops.

 If Colt chooses to kill Julianna and commits suicide to break the loop, he wakes back up on the beach (now a strange apocalyptic landscape) with Julianna holding him at gunpoint. She decides to spare him and departs, leaving him to face the uncertain future alone. The Goldenloop update expands on this ending, adding a cutscene showing all of the visionaries and eternalists awakening to find the loop broken. Colt is shown, along with a few other eternalists, venturing into the barren landscape.
 If Colt chooses to kill Julianna but refuses to commit suicide, the loop resets as normal. 
 If Colt chooses to spare Julianna, they reconcile and cooperate with each other to hunt the other inhabitants of Blackreef for fun.

Development and release
Deathloop was developed primarily by Arkane Studios at their Lyon, France locations. Game director Dinga Bakaba described the game as an "inverted Cluedo", a murder puzzle that the player needs to figure out how to solve in one perfect run after failing through many previous runs. The game is designed around aiding the player in learning the necessary pieces to this puzzle with each run, but they needed an element of unpredictability to make it a challenge. While current artificial intelligence (AI) in video games can lead to believable behavior, AI tends to lack surprising actions. This led to bringing in second online player to control Julianna as to randomly affect the player's game, itself something Arkane had explored in their unreleased title The Crossing. Deathloop is playable offline as well.

Deathloop combines elements of both the Dishonored series as well as Prey. They wanted to be able to give the player a wide range of abilities that they could select to try to complete the "perfect loop", many which mirror powers from both Dishonored and Prey. While the game does allow the player to use stealth and related abilities as in Dishonored to move quietly, Deathloop does not allow for non-lethal takedowns of non-player characters, as Arkane recognized the choice of killing or subduing enemies had weighed down players in Dishonored. These stealth abilities can still be chained together with other abilities to make Colt fight like John Wick, according to Bakaba. The Julianna character has a similar range of abilities, many of these closer to the Prey abilities such as being able to mimic any character in the game, including Colt, and thus interfere through activities such as drawing the player away from the real target with her mimicry or by posing as a duplicate Colt in front of one of the targets to cause confusion that way.

The game's setting of Blackreef is based on the Faroe Islands and the Scottish Highlands as seen in Skyfall, and inspired by the styles of the Swinging Sixties and the approach used to depict the era in Guy Ritchie's The Man from U.N.C.L.E.. To avoid making the game's visuals appear too close to that of Dishonored, they took cues from color use in films like High Plains Drifter and Point Blank, using bright colors and designs to give the island an endless party atmosphere. Billboards in the game that reveal secrets about the island were drawn from the film They Live. Besides time travel and time loop files like Groundhog Day, Edge of Tomorrow and the Back to the Future trilogy, the game was influenced by the French comedy La Colle and the film The Fourth Dimension. Films like The Running Man, The Warriors, The Wicker Man, Under the Volcano, and Dark City were used to draw inspiration for the game's plot of a solitary man working to solve a mystery in an isolated location while being hunted down by others. Colt's appearance drew heavily from Denzel Washington's character in The Book of Eli, while his motives were based around the Snake Plissken character from Escape from New York along with array of gadgets inspired by the James Bond series. The dialog was based around the films of Quentin Tarantino, particularly the interactions between Colt and Julianna.

Deathloop uses Arkane's Void Engine, previously used in Dishonored 2, based on the id Tech engine.

Deathloop was revealed at E3 2019. It was further showcased during Sony's PlayStation 5 event in June 2020, confirming that the game will see release as a timed console exclusive on the PlayStation 5 in late 2020 alongside a Windows release. In August 2020, it was announced the game was delayed until Q2 2021 as development was impacted by the governmental response to the COVID-19 pandemic. The company later announced it planned to release Deathloop on 21 May 2021. About a month prior to the planned May release, Arkane delayed the release until 14 September 2021, stating that they will be "using this extra time to accomplish our goal: create a fun, stylish, and mind-bending player experience."

Xbox Game Studios head Phil Spencer said that this deal would not affect Deathloops platform-exclusive release on the PlayStation 5, and the game would remain exclusive there for one year before arriving on other consoles. The game was released for Xbox Series X/S on 20 September 2022, alongside the "Goldenloop" update which introduces a new weapon, a new ability, new enemy types and cross-platform play, as well as an extended ending.

Reception 

Deathloop received "generally favorable reviews" from critics, according to review aggregator Metacritic.

In a review for Wired, Gabriel Solis wrote that the game's "profound meditation on time" kept him engaged in the game. Ars Technica criticized the invasion mechanic in Deathloop, feeling that Juliana had "no interesting strategies" to use against the other player. Eurogamer enjoyed the art style, feeling it built upon the foundations of Dishonored; comparing it to "an upper cruster's carnival with heady overtones of Tarantino and Wolfenstein".

Sales 
Deathloop was the 18th most-downloaded game on the PlayStation Store for 2021 in the US and Canada. Arkane stated the game had reached 5 million players by February 2023.

Awards and accolades

References

External links
 

2021 video games
Arkane Studios games
Bethesda Softworks games
First-person shooters
Golden Joystick Award winners
Immersive sims
Interactive Achievement Award winners
Multiplayer and single-player video games
PlayStation 5 games
Science fiction video games
The Game Awards winners
Video games about amnesia
Video games about time loops
Video games developed in France
Video games featuring black protagonists
Video games postponed due to the COVID-19 pandemic
Video games scored by Tom Salta
Video games set in the 1960s
Video games set in the Arctic
Video games set on fictional islands
Video games with alternate endings
Video games with time manipulation
Windows games
Xbox Series X and Series S games